Torre San Patrizio is a  (municipality) in the Province of Fermo in the Italian region of Marche, located about  south of Ancona and about  north of Ascoli Piceno.

In medieval times it was a free commune; later it was subjected to Cesare Borgia, the Sforza and the Papal States. It has 14th- to 15th-century walls.

References

Cities and towns in the Marche